Ariyathur is a village in Polur Taluk in Tiruvannamalai District of Tamil Nadu, India. It is located 47 km towards east from district headquarters Thiruvannamalai. 167 km from state capital Chennai.

Geography 
It is located 47 km to the east of  District headquarters Thiruvannamalai. Ariyathur Pin code is 606907 and postal head office is Vadamadimangalam. 
Ariyathur is surrounded by Melmalayanur Taluk towards south, Pernamallur Taluk towards north, Thellar Taluk towards east, West Arani Taluk towards north. 
Polur, Vandavasi, Tiruvethipuram, Tiruvannamalai are the nearby Cities to Ariyathur.	
This place is in the border of the Tiruvannamalai District and Villupuram District. Villupuram district Melmalayanur is south towards this place.
Tamil is the local language here.

Population 
The population in Ariyathur is 865 as per the survey of census during 2011 by Indian Government. There are 225 households in this village.
Population: 865
Households: 225
While the population is 865, there are 428 males in the village (49%) and 437 females are there (51%). Further the children below 6 years of age are 99 of which 52 are males and 47 are females.
Population Sex-wise	Children
Males: 428.
Male Percentage: 49%.
Total Females: 437.
Female Percentage: 51%.	Children below 6 Years age: 99
Male Children below 6 Years age: 52
Female

Education 
Pups-ariyathur
Address : Ariyathur, Chetpet, Tiruvannamalai, Tamil Nadu. PIN- 606907, Post - Vadamadimangalam
Renukampal Polytechnic College and art and science college
Address : Polur to vellore Road, Ettivadi
Annamalaiar College Of Engineering,
Address : Vandavasi—Porur High Way—Modaiyur Polur Tk Thiruvannamalai (dt) Tamil Nadu—606902

Transportation 
There is no railway station near to Ariyathur in less than 10 km. However Katpadi Junction Rail Way Station is major railway station 68 km near to Ariyathur.

References

Villages in Tiruvannamalai district